Interstate 35 (I-35) is an Interstate Highway in the US that runs from the Mexican border near Laredo, Texas, to Duluth, Minnesota. Along the way, I-35 passes through Wichita, the state's largest city, linking it to Emporia, Ottawa, and Kansas City and its Johnson County suburbs. The section of the route from the Oklahoma border to I-335 is part of the Kansas Turnpike.

Route description

Oklahoma border to Emporia 

I-35 enters Kansas from Oklahoma where the southern terminus of the Kansas Turnpike is located. After passing U.S. Highway 166 (US-166, East 160th Street South, exit 4) to the east of South Haven, the Interstate passes through a toll plaza, making I-35 into a toll road. The highway then passes US-160 (East 10th Avenue, exit 19) east of Wellington, then the Belle Plaine Service Area, the first of three on I-35, and the first of six on the turnpike. After the service area, the turnpike continues due north to Wichita and intersects I-135 (exit 42). After the I-135 interchange, the turnpike turns northeast and goes around Downtown Wichita. I-35 passes through Wichita's suburbs and, in the process, intersects US-54/US-400 (East Kellogg Avenue, exit 53A). Thereafter, the route intersects US-77 (North Main Street, exit 76) and various state highways near El Dorado. After El Dorado, the highway enters the Flint Hills region of Kansas. After passing the Cassoday interchange (K-177, exit 92), the turnpike begins its  stretch with no exits. The only stop along the way is the Matfield Green Service Area. After the remaining  with no exits or services, I-35 leaves the turnpike in Emporia. Here, the Interstate meets I-335 (exit 127), which the Turnpike carries toward Topeka.

Emporia to Kansas City 
I-35 passes through a toll plaza to continue on its own alignment running eastward through east-central Kansas. At Ottawa, it turns to a more northeasterly direction. After passing through the Kansas suburbs of the Kansas City Metro Area, it then crosses the state line into Missouri and into Downtown Kansas City.

History 

The original plan for I-35 was to follow US-50 from Newton, as well as US-81 and US-177 to the Oklahoma state line. But when the Kansas Turnpike was created, a part of I-35 was created south of Emporia. The Newton segment was declined, and there was another implication for US-50 that traveled north (which is known today). The segments from Olathe to Shawnee was created by 1962. The relocations of US-75 and K-31 were finished by 1975. I-35 in Kansas (as known today) had its final modification in 1976.

The Kansas Department of Transportation (KDOT) worked with the Burns & McDonnell engineering company to design a new interchange at Homestead Lane (exit 205) in Johnson County as a diverging diamond. The first interchange of its kind in the state, it opened September 28, 2013.

Exit list

Auxiliary routes 
There are five auxiliary routes branching directly or indirectly from I-35 in Kansas:
: a spur route from Wichita to Salina; originally signed as I-35W until September 1976
: a loop around the westside of Wichita; branches off of I-135
: a segment of the Kansas Turnpike connecting I-35 in Emporia to the state capital, Topeka
: the Kansas City beltway
: a bypass of downtown Kansas City providing access to I-29 in Missouri and Kansas City International Airport

References

External links
 Kansas Highway Maps: Current, Historic, KDOT

35
 Kansas
Transportation in Sumner County, Kansas
Transportation in Sedgwick County, Kansas
Transportation in Butler County, Kansas
Transportation in Chase County, Kansas
Transportation in Lyon County, Kansas
Transportation in Coffey County, Kansas
Transportation in Osage County, Kansas
Transportation in Franklin County, Kansas
Transportation in Miami County, Kansas
Transportation in Johnson County, Kansas
Transportation in Wyandotte County, Kansas